The NCAA Fencing Championships are awarded at the annual tournament held in March to determine the NCAA's national collegiate individual and team championships in fencing. Individual champions are determined by performance during the NCAA fencing team championship competition. Unlike most NCAA sports, the fencing championship is a single National Collegiate championship rather than being split into divisions.

History
Prior to 1990, separate men's championships were held, but since then, fencing has been a coed sport with teams having men's and women's squads, although some schools field only a women's team. Fencing is a single-division sport with schools from all three NCAA divisions competing against each other.

Fencing was one of twelve women's sports added to the NCAA championship program for the 1981–82 school year, as the NCAA engaged in battle with the Association for Intercollegiate Athletics for Women (AIAW) for sole governance of women's collegiate sports. The AIAW continued to conduct its established championship program in the same twelve (and other) sports; however, after a year of dual women's championships, the NCAA conquered the AIAW and usurped its authority and membership.

NCAA fencing follows the rules of the U.S. Fencing Association with several modifications.

Criticism of coed model 
After major publicity regarding the differences in facilities provided to participants in the 2021 Division I men's and women's basketball tournaments, the NCAA commissioned the law firm Kaplan Hecker & Fink to conduct a broad-based review of gender equity issues surrounding all of its championship events. The first phase dealt exclusively with Division I basketball; the second phase investigated all other NCAA championships, including fencing. In the second phase, both fencing stakeholders and NCAA staff identified a major gender inequity issue stemming from the NCAA's 1990 decision to combine the men's and women's team championships. As of the date of the report (the 2021–22 school year), no NCAA fencing programs fielded only a men's team, but many fielded only women's teams. Because the team champion is determined by combining each school's men's and women's points earned, and entry rules limit the number of participants of each sex per school and region, women-only teams cannot win the team championship. Some stakeholders have suggested that men's and women's team championships be reintroduced, either as substitutes for or supplements to the current coed championship. The NCAA's fencing committee has discussed this change, but it was still "under consideration" as of the report date.

Champions

Co-ed team championships (1990–present)

Separate team championships (1982–1989)

Men's-only team championships (1941–1981)

Note: Team scoring in 1990 was based on weapon team events standings. From 1991 to 1994, point values increased due to fencers not qualifying as part of a team being able to contribute points from individual performances. Weapon team events were eliminated in 1995, and team scoring was based entirely on individual performances; women's épée was added as a fifth weapon. Since 1998, team scoring has been based on a one-point system; women's sabre was added as a sixth weapon in 2000.

Team Titles

See also
List of NCAA fencing schools
AIAW Intercollegiate Women's Fencing Champions
Pre-NCAA Men's Fencing Champions
Pre-NCAA Women's Fencing Champions
USFA Division I National Championship
Ivy League Fencing Championships

References

External links
NCAA fencing
 
 

Fencing
Fencing competitions
College fencing in the United States
Fencing